Christophe Neff (born 10 June 1964 in Tübingen, Germany) is a Franco-German  geographer, working on Mediterranean ecosystems, the geography of the Mediterranean Basin and fire ecology at the Karlsruhe Institute of Technology. He is considered as one of the rare German experts on the Mediterranean ecosystem and fire ecology. Furthermore, he is an expert on the geography of Francophone Africa  and Lusophone Africa and the Azores. Since 2009, Neff regularly contributes to a blog called 'Paysages'  (engl.= landscapes) at le Monde.fr, which is mostly written in French, sometimes in German, and very occasionally in English.
On the 23 of April 2019 Neff announced on his blog, that he will finished editing “paysages” on the blog hosting service of LeMonde.fr, because Le Monde has decided to close up the Blogs Le Monde.fr. He also explained that he would try to relaunch “Paysages” with another hosting service. In the same post he also expressed his regrets that the cultural gap between France and Germany had never been as large as in 2019, reminding readers that the original idea had been to create a franco-german blog. In June 2021 he published a trilingual (French, German, English) retrospective of 12 years editing the blog paysages, including also a list of the most popular blog posts. In January 2022, he noted that a large part of the links from the times when paysages was still hosted by le Monde.fr had disappeared in the meantime

References

Sources

 Andreas Dittmann u.a (Hrsg): Wer ist wo? Geographinnen und Geographen an Universitäten, Hochschulen und Forschungseinrichtungen in Deutschland, Österreich und der Schweiz. Bonn 2006.

External links
 Homepage of Christophe Neff at the University of Karlsruhe including publication list  
 french-english-german paysage-landscape-landschaft Blog of Christophe Neff
 Broadcasting interview (Deutschlandfunk) about reducing wildfire risks by prescribed fire in Mediterranean France (German) (manuscript + streamline)
 Broadcasting Interview concerning wildland fires in Greece (Summer 2007) and wildfire situation in the Black Forest (Germany) (The interview is in German.) http://digbib.ubka.uni-karlsruhe.de/diva/2007-292/

1964 births
Living people
Scientists from Tübingen
French geographers
German bloggers
French bloggers
German geographers
French male writers
German male writers
Male bloggers
University of Mannheim alumni
People from Schramberg